Pierre "Pierry" Valmera (born September 29, 1981) is a retired Haitian professional basketball player, who played for Ancien in the Ligue Nationale de Basket in Switzerland.

Early years
Valmera was born in Port-au-Prince, Haiti. Having taught himself basketball in his native country, he emigrated to the United States and became a standout player at Union University in Tennessee.

Personal life
When Valmera's playing career concluded, he relocated to Boston, Massachusetts where he worked as a substitute teacher in French and history at a middle school. Soon after his arrival in the states, he met David Franklin Rose, a business owner of an architecture firm. Together, they founded a non-for-profit organization called POWERforward International Inc., created to help young Haitians gain private-school educations in the United States through basketball.  He is a philanthropist and donates his time and money to develop basketball in Haiti. He has 38 kids in the US on full basketball scholarships, including 6 college graduates and 1 playing for the Sacramento Kings, Skal Labissiere. Some of his other students go to the top schools in the country, like Mississippi State and Vanderbilt University.

References

External links
 Pierry Valmera at espn.com
 Pierry Valmera at eurobasket.com

1981 births
Living people
Haitian sportspeople
Haitian men's basketball players